Julius Bomholt (11 June 1896 – 2 January 1969) was a Danish politician representing the Social Democrats.

He was a member of the Folketing 1929–1968 and served as speaker in 1945–1950 and again 1964–1968. He served as Minister of Education in 1950 and 1953–1957, Minister of Social Affairs 1957–1961, and Minister of Culture 1961–1964.

He was awarded the Ingenio et Arti medal in 1966.

References

External links

1896 births
1969 deaths
Education ministers of Denmark
Speakers of the Folketing
Danish Culture Ministers
Recipients of Ingenio et Arti
20th-century Danish politicians